Cameron Melrose Lindsay (born 21 December 1992) is a New Zealand footballer who plays as a defensive midfielder for Tasman United in the New Zealand Football Championship.

Club career
Lindsay attended Wynton Rufer's WYNRS academy in Auckland and in 2007 contested the Manchester United Premier Cup with Central United. In 2009, he signed a four-year contract with Blackburn Rovers where he made 16 youth academy appearances. In 2011, he signed for Wellington Phoenix and despite making no appearances for the Phoenix during the 2011–12 A-League season signed a new two-year deal with club in April 2012.

Lindsay was in line to make his debut in the Round 2 away fixture versus Melbourne Heart due to seven Phoenix players being away on international duty but fell ill and was taken to hospital where doctors ruled him out of the game. He finally made his debut nearly three months later as a second-half substitute at AAMI Park against Melbourne Victory on 5 January 2013.

In September 2013 Lindsay was released from Wellington Phoenix and joined Team Wellington. At the end of the end of his first season with Team Wellington, he joined reigning champions Auckland City FC.

International career
Lindsay was in the New Zealand under 17 side that contested the 2009 FIFA U-17 World Cup in Nigeria, playing in all 4 of New Zealand's matches. In 2011, he travelled with the New Zealand under 20 side to the 2011 FIFA U-20 World Cup in Colombia where he made a single appearance.

International goals and caps
New Zealand's goal tally first.

International career statistics

References

External links

NZ Football profile
Wellington Phoenix profile
WYNRS profile

1992 births
Living people
Association footballers from Auckland
New Zealand association footballers
New Zealand international footballers
Association football midfielders
A-League Men players
Wellington Phoenix FC players
Team Wellington players
Tasman United players
New Zealand Football Championship players